O'Keefe is an album by singer-songwriter Danny O'Keefe, released in 1972 (see 1972 in music). It peaked at #87 on the Billboard Top LPs chart. The lead-off single was "Good Time Charlie's Got the Blues" (a re-recording of a song O'Keefe had first recorded for his self-titled debut album two years earlier), which reached #9 on the Billboard Hot 100 chart and was covered by numerous artists. "The Road" was covered by Jackson Browne on his album Running on Empty. O'Keefe was reissued in 2006 on the Wounded Bird label.

Reception

Thom Jurek states in his Allmusic review: "O'Keefe is utterly solid, so completely diverse and tight; it's a forgotten masterpiece."

Track listing
All songs by Danny O'Keefe unless otherwise noted.
 "Good Time Charlie's Got the Blues" – 3:00
 "Shooting Star" – 2:39
 "The Question (Obviously)" – 3:39
 "Honky Tonkin'" (Hank Williams) – 2:49
 "The Road" – 3:49
 "Grease It" – 3:16
 "An American Dream" – 5:14
 "Louie the Hook vs. the Preacher" – 3:37
 "The Valentine Pieces" – 3:17
 "I'm Sober Now" – 2:45
 "Roseland Taxi Dancer" – 2:47
 "I Know You Really Love Me" – 0:59

Personnel
Danny O'Keefe – vocals, lead acoustic guitar, lead electric guitar
Hayward Bishop – drums, percussion
David Brigati – backing vocals
Eddie Brigati – backing vocals
Gene Chrisman – drums
Johnny Christopher – acoustic guitar
Bobby Emmons – organ
Shane Keister – piano
Bobby Wood	 – piano, electric piano
Reggie Young – electric guitar
Leo LeBlanc – steel guitar
Mike Leech – bass
Irwin "Marky" Markowitz – trumpet
Howard McNatt – violin
Phil Olivella – clarinet
Production notes:
Arif Mardin – producer, mixing
Ahmet Ertegun, Neil Rosengarden - assistant producers
Stan Kesler – engineer
Gene Paul – engineer
George Hunter – design
L.K. Hollister - cover illustration

References

1972 albums
albums produced by Arif Mardin
Atlantic Records albums